The following highways are numbered 60:

International
 Asian Highway 60
 European route E60

Australia
 Bruxner Highway
 Dawson Highway (Rolleston to Gladstone) - Queensland State Route 60

Brazil
 BR-060

Canada
 Alberta Highway 60
 Manitoba Highway 60
 Newfoundland and Labrador Route 60
 Ontario Highway 60
 Saskatchewan Highway 60

China 
  G60 Expressway

Hungary
  M60 motorway (Hungary)

India

Israel/Palestine
 Highway 60 (Israel–Palestine)

Italy
 Autostrada A60

Japan
 Obihiro-Hiroo Expressway

Jordan

Korea, South
 Seoul–Yangyang Expressway
Gukjido 60

New Zealand
 New Zealand State Highway 60

Philippines
 N60 highway (Philippines)

United Kingdom
 British A60
 British M60

United States
 U.S. Route 60
 Alabama State Route 60
 Arkansas Highway 60
 California State Route 60
 Colorado State Highway 60
 Florida State Road 60
 Georgia State Route 60
 Georgia State Route 60 (former)
 Georgia State Route 60 (former)
 Idaho State Highway 60
 Illinois Route 60
 Indiana State Road 60
 Iowa Highway 60
 K-60 (Kansas highway)
 Louisiana Highway 60
 Louisiana State Route 60 (former)
 Maryland Route 60
 Massachusetts Route 60
 M-60 (Michigan highway)
 Minnesota State Highway 60
 County Road 60 (Dakota County, Minnesota)
 County Road 60 (Hennepin County, Minnesota)
Missouri Route 60 (1922) (former)
 Nebraska Highway 60 (former)
Nevada:
 Nevada State Route 60 (1937) (former)
 Nevada State Route 60 (1940s) (former)
 New Jersey Route 60 (former)
 County Route 60 (Bergen County, New Jersey)
 New York State Route 60
 County Route 60 (Broome County, New York)
 County Route 60 (Cayuga County, New York)
 County Route 60 (Chemung County, New York)
 County Route 60 (Dutchess County, New York)
 County Route 60 (Franklin County, New York)
 County Route 60 (Niagara County, New York)
 County Route 60 (Oneida County, New York)
 County Route 60 (Onondaga County, New York)
 County Route 60 (Orange County, New York)
 County Route 60 (Putnam County, New York)
 County Route 60 (Rensselaer County, New York)
 County Route 60 (Rockland County, New York)
 County Route 60 (Saratoga County, New York)
 County Route 60 (Schenectady County, New York)
 County Route 60 (Schoharie County, New York)
 County Route 60 (Suffolk County, New York)
 County Route 60 (Tioga County, New York)
 County Route 60 (Washington County, New York)
 North Carolina Highway 60
 North Dakota Highway 60
 Ohio State Route 60
 Pennsylvania Route 60
 South Carolina Highway 60
 Tennessee State Route 60
 Texas State Highway 60
 Texas State Highway Loop 60
 Farm to Market Road 60
 Urban Road 60 (signed as Farm to Market Road 60)
 Texas Park Road 60
 Utah State Route 60
 Wisconsin Highway 60

Territories:
 Puerto Rico Highway 60
 U.S. Virgin Islands Highway 60

See also
List of highways numbered 60A
A60